The Bainbridge Commercial Historic District is a historic district comprising the downtown business area of Bainbridge, Georgia. It includes Bainbridge's original courthouse square, now Willis Park, and 56 contributing buildings in a  area roughly bounded by Water, Clark, Troupe, West, Broughton, & Crawford streets.  The district was added to the National Register of Historic Places in 1987.

In 1987, the district had 56 contributing buildings and one contributing site (Willis Park), plus 24 non-contributing buildings.

See also
Bainbridge Residential Historic District, to the south and east

References

External links 

 National Register listings for Decatur County
 Bainbridge Map showing historic district area

Historic districts on the National Register of Historic Places in Georgia (U.S. state)
Geography of Decatur County, Georgia
National Register of Historic Places in Decatur County, Georgia